Twarres is a folk/pop band from Wergea in the Netherlands who perform songs in both English and their native Frisian language. Their songs are primarily lush, harmonic vocal pop with a focus on acoustic instrumentation such as pianos and violins. Their debut single "Wêr bisto" won the audience's award at the 1999 Frisian Song Contest. The band has one platinum certified album and single respectively.

Band history
At the end of 2003 Twarres held their last concert. In August 2006 Twarres announced that a reunion would take place, most probably during 2007 or early 2008. A comeback album by Twarres was scheduled for the early spring of 2008. On 15 August 2007, it was announced that due to health reasons Johan van der Veen would leave the band. He was replaced by Auke Busman who also left later. In August/September 2009 Dutch radio station Q-music organised a talent competition to look for "the new Johan". The jury was formed by Mirjam, Johan and some others. On 11 September 2009, the competition was won by Joost Bloemendal.

In 2006, Mirjam Timmer, singer and guitarist of Twarres, also started a solo career under the name "Mir". Her solo album entitled Files from London was released in 2006.

As of 2017, Twarres was a trio comprising Timmer and brothers Julian and Kristian Dijkstra. The 2016 single "Fûgelfrij" was recorded by these band members. In 2017, it was announced though that Julian Dijkstra would leave the band.

Band members
Mirjam Timmer (born July 1, 1982) – vocals and guitar
Kristian Dijkstra (born April 26, 1988) – vocals

Other band members
Gregor Hamilton – keyboard
Peter Krako – guitar
Serge Bredewold – bass
Sietse Huisman – drums
Yfke de Jong – violin

Discography

Albums

Singles

Notes and references
Notes

References

External links
Mirmusic

Dutch folk music groups
1999 establishments in the Netherlands